Arthur Kenneth Mathews  was Dean of St Albans from 1955 until 1963.He was born into an ecclesiastical family on 11 May 1906 and educated at Monkton Combe School and Balliol College, Oxford, where he met his future brother-in-law Henry Brooke, Baron Brooke of Cumnor through the Balliol Boys' Club, of which they were successively president.  He was ordained in 1933. His first post was as a Curate at Penistone after which he was Padre to the Tanker Fleet of the Anglo-Saxon Petroleum Company and then  Vicar of Forest Row. When World War II came he enlisted as a Chaplain in the RNVR during which he served on HMS Norfolk and was decorated twice for gallantry - in successful engagements against the German battleships Bismarck (in 1941) and Scharnhorst (in 1943). When peace returned he was Vicar of Rogate (1946–54) and Rural Dean of Midhurst (1950–54)  before his elevation to the Deanery. After this he was Rector of St Peter’s, Peebles (1963–68) and Vicar of Thursley (1968-1976) before retiring in 1976. "A sailor's padre to the end", he died on 18 December 1992.

He was married twice:  in 1936 to Agnes Elisabeth (Betty) Butler (who died in 1981) and in 1987 to Diana Goschen (who survived him).  He had no children.

References

1906 births
People educated at Monkton Combe School
Alumni of Balliol College, Oxford
Royal Naval Volunteer Reserve personnel of World War II
Officers of the Order of the British Empire
Recipients of the Distinguished Service Cross (United Kingdom)
Deans of St Albans
1992 deaths
People from Penistone
World War II chaplains
Royal Navy chaplains
People from Forest Row